Lac-Drolet is a municipality in the Municipalité régionale de comté du Granit in Estrie, Quebec, Canada. Population is 1,108 as of 2006.

The minor Battle of the Chaudière, opposing British police and Lower Canadian rebels, was fought at Lac-Drolet during the Patriots' War in 1838. The battle had little incidence on the war, and about 50 rebels were captured and three were hanged.

Sources

External links

Commission de toponymie du Québec
Ministère des Affaires municipales, des Régions et de l'Occupation du territoire

Municipalities in Quebec
Incorporated places in Estrie
Le Granit Regional County Municipality